St Mary's are a Gaelic Athletic Association Gaelic football club from town of Cahersiveen in the south of County Kerry, Ireland. They are one of the most successful teams in South Kerry having won South Kerry Senior Football Championship 34 times.

Honours

 South Kerry Senior Football Championships: (35)  1937, 1938, 1940, 1941, 1942, 1943, 1944, 1947, 1949, 1952, 1954, 1955, 1960, 1969, 1971, 1973, 1978, 1980, 1984, 1985, 1991, 1992, 1995, 2001, 2002, 2003, 2009, 2010, 2011, 2014, 2015 2016, 2017, 2018, 2020, 2021
 Kerry Intermediate Football Championships: (2) 2001, 2015
 Munster Intermediate Club Football Championship: (1) 2015
 All-Ireland Intermediate Club Football Championship: (1) 2016
 Kerry Junior Football Championship 2: (2) 1983, 2010
 Munster Junior Club Football Championship: (1) 2010
 All-Ireland Junior Club Football Championship: (1) 2011
 Kerry County Football League - Division 1: (1) 2003
 Kerry County Football League - Division 2: (3)1990, 1992, 2001

Notable players

 Jerome O'Shea
 Bryan Sheehan
 Jack O'Shea
 Maurice Fitzgerald

References

External links
 St Mary's on Facebook

Gaelic football clubs in County Kerry
Gaelic games clubs in County Kerry